The Legend of Ai Glatson is an album by American jazz violinist Leroy Jenkins recorded in 1978 for the Italian Black Saint label.

Reception

The AllMusic review by Ron Wynn states "it's loaded with great violin solos, as well as some unusual, intriguing arrangements and compositions". The authors of The Penguin Guide to Jazz Recordings noted that the album was created shortly after the breakup of the Revolutionary Ensemble, and stated that it "is one of the few places in contemporary jazz where the direct and unassimilated influence of Cecil Taylor can be detected, and it remains strongly reminiscent of Cecil's Cafe Montmartre sessions. Jenkins is in stunningly good form, and his solo play on tributes to two modern saxophone players, 'Brax Stone' and 'Albert Ayler (His Life Was Too Short)', is as good as anything in his catalogue. Legend isn't the prettiest of recordings, but it has all the intensity Jenkins brings to live performance."

Track listing
All compositions by Leroy Jenkins
 "Ai Glatson" - 10:33
 "Brax Stone" - 8:53
 "Albert Ayler (His Life Was Too Short)" - 4:06
 "Tuesday Child" - 5:23
 "What Goes Around Comes Around" - 8:28
Recorded at GRS Studios in Milano, Italy in July 1978

Personnel
Leroy Jenkins - violin
Anthony Davis - piano
Andrew Cyrille - percussion

References

Black Saint/Soul Note albums
Leroy Jenkins (jazz musician) albums
1978 albums